Nyctemera browni is a moth of the family Erebidae first described by Schultze in 1908. It is found in the Philippines and Taiwan.

References

 , 1994: The browni-group of Nyctemera (Lepidoptera, Arctiidae) from the Philippines, with descriptions of three new species. Tinea 14 (1): 13-19.
 

Nyctemerina
Moths described in 1908